Parmouti 3 - Coptic Calendar - Parmouti 5

The fourth day of the Coptic month of Parmouti, the eighth month of the Coptic year. In common years, this day corresponds to March 30, of the Julian Calendar, and April 12, of the Gregorian Calendar. This day falls in the Coptic Season of Shemu, the season of the Harvest.

Commemorations

Martyrs 

 The martyrdom of Saints Victor, Decius, Irene the Virgin, and those who were with them

Saints 

 The departure of Saint Okeen

References 

Days of the Coptic calendar